Éva Circé-Côté (1871–1949), born Éva Circé in Montreal, was a journalist, a poet, and a librarian who established Montreal's first public library in 1903. She wrote under several pseudonyms during her lifetime, including Colombine, Musette, Jean Nay, Fantasio, Arthur Maheu, Julien Saint-Michel, and Paul S. Bédard.

Works

Plays
 1903 : Hindelang et DeLorimier (historical drama in five Acts)
 1904 : Le Fumeur endiablé (One-act play)
 1921 : Maisonneuve (historical drama in four Acts)
 1922 : L'Anglomanie (3-act play, awarded the prix de l'Action française)

Poetry
 1903: Bleu, Blanc, Rouge. Poésie, paysages, causeries. (Collection of poems and essays, under the pseudonym Colombine), Déom Frères éditeurs, Montréal, 1903

Essays
 1924: Papineau, son influence sur la pensée canadienne; essai de psychologie historique, Ève Circé-Côté (editor), R.A. Regnault & cie imprimeurs, Montréal, 1924.  Republished: Lux, Montréal, 2002, 266 pages .

Articles available on-line
 1916 : L'éducation de nos filles : elles doivent être protégées pour les luttes de la vie
 1916 : Incapacité intellectuelle et civile de la femme
 1917 : Travail égal - salaire égal
 1918 : Le rôle de la femme en politique
 1921 : Décence et hypocrisie
 1923 : Restons chez-nous: L'exode des Canadiens aux États-Unis

References
.

External links
 

1871 births
1949 deaths
Canadian librarians
Canadian women librarians
Canadian poets in French
Journalists from Montreal
Canadian women poets
Writers from Montreal
Canadian women journalists
Canadian women non-fiction writers
20th-century Canadian poets
20th-century Canadian women writers